Frances Wilson may refer to:

 Frances C. Wilson, United States Marine Corps general
 Frances Wilson (writer) (born 1964), British author 
 Fran Wilson (born 1991), English cricketer

See also
 Frances Wilson Grayson (died 1927), American aviator
 Francis Wilson (disambiguation) for men of the similar name